Tim Cowan (born August 17, 1960) is a former American football quarterback who played four seasons in the Canadian Football League with the BC Lions and Toronto Argonauts. Cowan played college football at the University of Washington. He was a member of the BC Lions team that won the 73rd Grey Cup.

Cowan's sons Joe and Patrick played football at UCLA.

References

External links
Just Sports Stats
Career stats
CFLapedia stats
Fanbase profile

Living people
1960 births
Players of American football from California
Sportspeople from Los Angeles County, California
American football quarterbacks
Canadian football quarterbacks
American players of Canadian football
Washington Huskies football players
BC Lions players
Toronto Argonauts players
People from Lynwood, California